Savin is a masculine surname of Slavic origin; in Slavic countries its feminine counterpart is Savina.

It is also a name of Anglo-French origin derived from Savin or Selvin; or of Irish origin, derived from Ó Sabháin.

Surname
 Aleksandr Borisovich Savin (born 1957), Soviet volleyball player
 Aleksandr Mikhailovich Savin (born 1984), Russian footballer
Alina Vera Savin (born 1988), Romanian bobsledder
Anatoly Savin (1920–2016), Russian scientist
Anton Savin (born 1990), Ukrainian football player
Artem Savin (born 1981), Ukrainian football player
Denis Savin, Russian solo dancer
 Eric Savin, the alter ego of fictional Marvel Comics supervillain Coldblood
Francisco Savín (1929–2018), Mexican conductor and composer
Graham Savin (born 1964), English cricketer
 Ioan Gheorghe Savin (1885–1973), Romanian theologian
Ivan Savin (born 1981), Russian ice hockey defenceman
Janice Savin Williams, Jamaican businesswoman
Jean-Jacques Savin (1947–2022), French adventurer
John Savin (born 1942), English cricketer
Maurice Savin (1894–1973), French artist, painter, ceramicist and tapestry-maker
Nicolas Savin (1768/1787–1894), French soldier
Ovidiu Savin (born 1977), Romanian mathematician
Pearl Savin (1914–2000), New Zealand cricketer
Risto Savin (1858–1948), Slovenian composer
Ritch Savin-Williams (born 1949), American psychologist
Robert Savin, 17th century American politician
Ronald Savin, American military officer and chemical engineer 
Sergei Savin, Russian singer 
Sergey Savin (volleyball) (born 1988), Russian volleyball player
 Thomas Savin  (1826-1889), British railway engineer
Viktor Savin (1888—1943), Russian (Komi) poet
 Vitaliy Savin (born 1966), Kazakhstani sprinter
 Yevgeny Savin (born 1984), Russian football player

Given name
Savin Sever (1927–2003), Slovenian architect

See also
Savvin

References 

Russian-language surnames
Romanian-language surnames